Hygrophila may refer to:
 Hygrophila (gastropod), a clade situated under the class and above the superfamily in the gastropods taxonomy
 Hygrophila (plant), a plant genus
 Astercantha longifolia, commonly known as hygrophila in English, an annual herb species distributed throughout India